Recophora canteneri is a moth of the family Noctuidae. It is found in Morocco, Portugal, Spain, France, Italy, Algeria and Mauritania.

Adults are on wing from April to July.

The larvae feed on Herbaceae species.

External links
species info

Cuculliinae
Moths described in 1833